Suryo Agung Wibowo (born 8 October 1983) is an Indonesian sprinter who specializes in the 100 metres. Dubbed as "the Fastest Man in Southeast Asia," his personal best time, also the current Southeast Asian Games record, is 10.17 seconds achieved at the 2009 Southeast Asian Games in Laos.

He competed at the 2003 World Indoor Championships, the 2003 World Championships and the 2008 Olympic Games without progressing to the second round. In Beijing he placed 6th in his heat in a time of 10.46 seconds.

Other Achievements

References

External links
Sports reference biography

1983 births
Living people
Indonesian male sprinters
Athletes (track and field) at the 2008 Summer Olympics
Olympic athletes of Indonesia
Athletes (track and field) at the 2010 Asian Games
People from Surakarta
Sportspeople from Central Java
Southeast Asian Games medalists in athletics
Southeast Asian Games gold medalists for Indonesia
Southeast Asian Games silver medalists for Indonesia
Southeast Asian Games bronze medalists for Indonesia
Competitors at the 2003 Southeast Asian Games
Competitors at the 2005 Southeast Asian Games
Competitors at the 2007 Southeast Asian Games
Competitors at the 2009 Southeast Asian Games
Asian Games competitors for Indonesia
21st-century Indonesian people